Thalia Mara Mahoney (née Elizabeth Symons; June 28, 1911 –  October 8, 2003) was an American ballet dancer and educator who authored 11 books on the subject.

Biography

Mara was born Elizabeth Simons in Chicago in 1911, the daughter of Russian émigré parents. After beginning her performance career in Chicago, Mara traveled to Paris in 1927.  Together with her husband Arthur Mahoney, in 1962 she established the National Academy of Ballet and Theatre Arts in New York. After living in New York, Mara moved to Jackson, Mississippi, where she helped found the USA International Ballet Competition. She authored eleven books on ballet, as well as founded the Thalia Mara Arts International Foundation.

Legacy
In recognition of her contributions, in 1994 the Jackson, Mississippi Municipal Auditorium was renamed Thalia Mara Hall.

Another performance space, the Thalia Hall in the Pilsen Historic District located at 18th Street and Allport Street on Chicago's Lower West Side, is also named for her.

Works

References

External links
  
http://www.thaliamara.com/about_thalia.html

1911 births
2003 deaths
Ballet teachers
Dance writers
Writers from Chicago
Writers from Jackson, Mississippi
Educators from Illinois
American women educators
Educators from Mississippi
20th-century American women writers
20th-century American non-fiction writers
American people of Russian-Jewish descent
20th-century American Jews
American women non-fiction writers
21st-century American Jews
21st-century American women